George W. Winkleman (1859–1921) was a professional baseball player. He appeared in four games in Major League Baseball for the 1883 Louisville Eclipse, playing three games as a left fielder and one as a center fielder.

External links

Major League Baseball outfielders
Louisville Eclipse players
Hamilton (minor league baseball) players
Baseball players from New York (state)
19th-century baseball players
1859 births
1921 deaths